The prime minister of Slovenia, officially the president of the Government of the Republic of Slovenia, is the head of the Government of the Republic of Slovenia. There have been nine officeholders since the country gained parliamentary democracy in 1989 and independence in 1991.

The prime minister of Slovenia is nominated by the president of the republic after consultation with the parties represented in the National Assembly. He is then formally elected by a simple majority of the National Assembly. If no candidate receives a majority, a new vote must be held within 14 days. If no candidate receives a majority after this round, the President must dissolve the legislature and call new parliamentary elections unless the National Assembly agrees to hold a third round. If no candidate is elected after a third round, then the legislature is automatically dissolved pending new elections. In practice, since the appointee must command a majority of the National Assembly in order to govern, the appointee is usually the leader of the majority party in the National Assembly or the leader of the senior partner in the governing coalition. The National Assembly can only withdraw its support from a prime minister by way of a constructive vote of no confidence–that is, a motion of no confidence is of no effect unless a prospective successor has the support of a majority. The prime minister is also the president of the National Security Council.

Election 
The prime minister is elected by the National Assembly of Slovenia.

First round 
Following the parliamentary election new National Assembly meets at the constitutive session (usually around 2–3 weeks after election; the president of the republic convenes the session after receiving the official report on election from the State Election Commission), after which new parliamentary groups are officially formed. After all groups are formed (usually within few days), the president meets with leaders of the groups for consultations. During the consultations, the president tries to identify a candidate that could secure an absolute majority in the National Assembly (46 votes). After the consultations, the president can officially propose a candidate to the president of the National Assembly, this has to be done within 30 days after the constitutive session. Assembly takes vote on the candidate within 7 days, but not earlier than 48 hours after proposal. Candidate has to present his vision of his government before the National Assembly before the vote. When a prime minister is elected, the formation of a new government begins.

Second round 
If there is no prime minister elected, the second round will take place. After new consultations, the president can propose a new candidate or the same candidate again within 14 days of the first round vote. In the second round parliamentary groups and groups of 10 MPs can propose a candidate as well. Vote takes place no earlier than 48 hours from the proposal but not later than 7 days from it. If there are more candidates proposed, the National Assembly will first vote on the candidate proposed by the president, only if that candidate is not elected, The assembly will take votes on other candidates in the order of submission of the proposals. A prime minister is elected with absolute majority (46 votes). When a prime minister is elected, formation of a new government begins.

If the National Assembly once again fails to elect a prime minister, the president will dissolve the National Assembly and call a snap election, unless the National Assembly decides, within 48 hours from the vote, to hold a third round of election.

Third round 
In the third round, the prime minister is elected by a relative majority (majority of present MPs). Votes take place within seven days from the decision but not earlier than 48 hours. In the third round, the National Assembly first votes on all the candidates from the first and second round, and if none of the candidates receives a majority of votes, then it will vote on new proposals, first on the proposal by the president, then on the other in the order of submission. If a prime minister is elected formation of a new government begins, if not, the president dissolves the National Assembly and snap election takes place.

Oath of office 
The prime minister officially takes office after all of his ministers take oath of office before the National Assembly, following the election of government with a relative majority in the National Assembly. The prime minister takes the oath of office after his election.

The prime minister and other ministers take the same oath of office according to the Article 104 of the Constitution: “I swear that I shall uphold the constitutional order, that I shall act according to my conscience and that I shall do all in my power for the good of Slovenia.”

List of prime ministers of Slovenia

Preceding posts (prior to independence)

Prime Ministers of the Republic of Slovenia

Statistics

Timeline

Deputy prime minister 
Deputy prime minister is an unofficial title given to certain ministers in the government (usually leaders of coalition parties other than that from which prime minister comes). Deputy prime minister does not have any additional duties to those that come with the office of minister. There are usually multiple deputy prime ministers in each government.

List of deputy prime ministers

References

See also 
 Government of Slovenia
 President of Slovenia

 
Slovenia, Prime Minister of
Government of Slovenia
Prime Ministers
1990 establishments in Slovenia